The Sissa River (Aesesa River) is a river of Flores, East Nusa Tenggara, Indonesia. The 87-km river flows from a southwest to northeast direction, with the upstream at Mount Inielika north of Bajawa, Ngada Regency and discharges into the Flores Sea near Mbay, Nagekeo Regency.

Hydrology 
The watershed (Indonesian: Daerah Aliran Sungai/DAS) Aesesa has an area of 1,230 km2 with round form, comprising two regencies: Ngada Regency and Nagekeo Regency. The upstream at Ngada Regency near Bajawa is called "Wae Woki river". The major tributaries are:

 Ae Mau river
 Lowo Ulu river
 Lowo Langge river
 Lowo Lele river
 Lowo Me Bhada river
 Wae Bia river
 Wae Bhara river
Aesesa river has a length of 87 km with an average discharge of around 7.5 m3/second

Uses 
The inhabitants along the Aesesa River use the water for agriculture, with the help of "Sutami Dam" at Nggolo Mbay, District of Aesesa, Nagekeo Regency which distributes the water to farmlands around 6,452 hectare in Nagekeo Regency at an average discharge of 14.69 m3/second. At the upstream, there is several waterfalls, like "Ogi waterfall" and "Soso waterfall". Ogi waterfall has a height of more than 30-meter and is utilized as a major tourist attraction of Bajawa.

Geography 

The river flows in the middle to the north of Flores with predominantly tropical savanna climate (designated as Aw in the Köppen-Geiger climate classification). The annual average temperature in the area is 26 °C. The warmest month is November, when the average temperature is around 30 °C, and the coldest is February, at 23 °C. The average annual rainfall is 1686 mm. The wettest month is January, with an average of 302 mm rainfall, and the driest is September, with 8 mm rainfall.

See also
List of rivers of Indonesia
List of rivers of Lesser Sunda Islands

References

Rivers of Flores Island (Indonesia)
Rivers of Indonesia